Mesosa medioalbofaciata is a species of beetle in the family Cerambycidae. It was described by Stephan von Breuning in 1969. It is known from Taiwan.

References

medioalbofaciata
Beetles described in 1969